Hospital is a stop on the Luas light-rail tram system in Dublin, Ireland.  It opened in 2004 as a stop on the Red Line.  The stop is located on a section of reserved track at the side of Cookstown Way in south-west Dublin, immediately outside Tallaght University Hospital.  
The stop is also served by Dublin Bus routes 27, 49, 54A, 56A, 65, 65B, 75, 76, 76A, 76B, 77A, and 210.

Incidents
On 23 February 2008, Cookstown Way was the site of the first ever fatal incident on the Luas.  Tallaght resident Anthony Creed was struck by a southbound tram a short distance south of the Hospital stop.  He was taken to Tallaght Hospital itself, where he died the following morning.

On 14 February 2019 a woman was struck and killed on a Tallaght bound tram between the Cookstown and Tallaght Hospital stops. She was pronounced dead at the scene.

References

Luas Red Line stops in South Dublin (county)